Hypnotic Hick  is the 51st animated cartoon short subject in the Woody Woodpecker series. Released theatrically on September 26, 1953, the film was produced by Walter Lantz Productions and distributed by Universal International. It was Universal Pictures' first animated project released in 3D.

Plot
While happily roller skating, Woody (Grace Stafford) gets bullied by an angry Buzz Buzzard (Dal McKennon) who has just avoided being served a summons. Thinking the woodpecker might want to seek mild revenge on Buzz, law officer I. Gypem (also McKennon) tells Woody he will pay him a dollar to serve Buzz with the summons.

Woody happily accepts the offer from Gypem, but Buzz manages to stop all attempts at delivering the summons. Woody then stumbles on a book about hypnotism, which declares: "Influence others and be their master." Woody reads the book cover to cover, and then decides to "practice" his newly acquired skill on Buzz. At first, he has some fun by putting the reluctant buzzard to sleep. Then, Woody turns him into a dog, a monkey, and appropriately enough, a woodpecker.

Finally, Woody blindfolds himself, begins walking on a skyscraper skeleton and tells Buzz (who has been fitted with Woody's roller skates), "I am your master. You must protect me at all times." The two encounter several death defying close calls before Woody manages to secure Buzz and escort him to I. Gypem's office.

Supposedly thankful, Gypem has the audacity to serve Woody with a summons, accusing the woodpecker of "practicing hypnotism out of season." Incensed, Woody hypnotizes Buzz into thinking he is a hungry giant and Gypem is a tasty ham sandwich. While Buzz chases Gypem out of the office and into the city, Woody celebrates his victory by throwing the money into the air and doing his trademark laugh.

Notes
 Hypnotic Hick was the sole Woody Woodpecker entry released in 3-D, in an attempt to cash in on the stereoscopic craze started with the film Bwana Devil.
 Hypnotic Hick introduced yet another new rendition of "The Woody Woodpecker Song," which first appeared in the 1948 film Wet Blanket Policy. This rendition, featuring a prominent trumpet and piano riff, would become the de facto version, regularly appearing until 1961's Franken-Stymied.
 Hypnotic Hick was also the first time Woody began speaking more regularly since 1949's Drooler's Delight. The woodpecker had become virtually silent since Grace Stafford started supplying voice for the character in 1951, with the occasional dialogue line or two cropping up beginning with Stage Hoax.
 Hypnotic Hick has a special opening sequence which highlights the presence of the 3D technique. Woody first bursts through a background tree, with the flying sawdust forming his name. Then Woody pops out of another tree, moves extremely close to the screen, and delivers his trademark laugh. This animated short is the last to have Woody popping out from a tree (and the only one to use this unique opening sequence), as Woody would return to popping from a wooden board in the next film, Hot Noon (or 12 O'Clock for Sure), and would continue to do so until the series end in 1972.

References

 Cooke, Jon, Komorowski, Thad, Shakarian, Pietro, and Tatay, Jack. "1953". The Walter Lantz Cartune Encyclopedia.

1953 animated films
1953 films
Walter Lantz Productions shorts
Woody Woodpecker films
1953 3D films
3D short films
1950s American animated films
American 3D films
Universal Pictures animated short films
Animated films about animals
Animated films about birds
1950s English-language films